Pedro Grajales Escobar (born 14 June 1940) is a Colombian sprinter. He competed in the 200 metres at the 1964 Summer Olympics and the 1968 Summer Olympics.

References

1940 births
Living people
Athletes (track and field) at the 1964 Summer Olympics
Athletes (track and field) at the 1968 Summer Olympics
Colombian male sprinters
Olympic athletes of Colombia
Pan American Games bronze medalists for Colombia
Pan American Games medalists in athletics (track and field)
Athletes (track and field) at the 1967 Pan American Games
Athletes (track and field) at the 1971 Pan American Games
Competitors at the 1970 Central American and Caribbean Games
Central American and Caribbean Games silver medalists for Colombia
Place of birth missing (living people)
Central American and Caribbean Games medalists in athletics
Medalists at the 1967 Pan American Games
20th-century Colombian people
21st-century Colombian people